The Stevens SU-1 is an American single seat, high-wing, strut-braced, glider that was designed in 1933 by students at the Stevens Institute of Technology in Hoboken, New Jersey.

Design and development
The SU-1 was developed as an attempt to improve the performance of the Franklin PS-2, by designing new wings for it as a student project. The PS-2's straight  wings were replaced with  gull-wings. Like the original wings, the new wings have two spars, but instead of parallel struts, the new wings use V-struts terminating at a single fuselage attachment point. Jury struts are also used. Like the original wings, the new wings are a wooden structure, covered in doped aircraft fabric covering. The SU-1 retains the PS-2's original steel tube fuselage. The landing gear is a fixed monowheel type.

Testing showed that the Stevens Institute students were successful and the SU-1 has a glide ratio of 17:1, two points better than the PS-2. It also has a slightly higher sink rate of 180 feet per minute versus the PS-2's 150.

About four SU-1s were produced.

Operational history
In 1983 Soaring Magazine reported that two SU-1s were still in existence, one in serviceable condition and one in need of repair.

In April 2011 one remained on the Federal Aviation Administration register.

Specifications (variant specified)

See also

References

1930s United States sailplanes
Stevens Institute of Technology
Aircraft first flown in 1933